Aleksandr Pavlovich Bogomoev (born 17 November 1989) is a Russian freestyle wrestler of Buryat descent, who competed for the men's freestyle 61 kg at the World Wrestling Championships 2014 in Tashkent, Uzbekistan. He was eliminated in the quarterfinal rounds, after being defeated by Cuba's Yowlys Bonne, based on the technical score 0-10. Winner Golden Grand Prix Ivan Yarygin 2015 and two time Russian National Champion (2014, 2015). International Master of Sports in freestyle wrestling. Gold medalist World cup 2011 in Makhachkala, Dagestan, Russia. In World cup 2015 he won silver medal in Los Angeles, California, United States. European Nations' Cup (Moscow Lights) 2014 winner. In 2015 European Games he defeated in the semifinal match 2x World Champion Haji Aliyev and in gold medal match he over Beka Lomtadze of Georgia.

References

1989 births
Buryat people
Living people
Wrestlers at the 2015 European Games
European Games medalists in wrestling
European Games gold medalists for Russia
People from Ekhirit-Bulagatsky District
Russian male sport wrestlers
European Wrestling Championships medalists
European Wrestling Champions
Sportspeople from Irkutsk Oblast
21st-century Russian people